Saint-Martin-de-Boscherville is a commune in the Seine-Maritime department in the Normandy region in northern France.

Geography

Population

Places of interest

 The abbey church of St. Georges, dating from the twelfth century.
 twelfth century vestiges of the abbey (cloisters and halls etc.)
 Ancient wood-framed houses.
 The thirteenth century Templars manorhouse at Genetay.
 Ruins of the old castle of Genetay.
 The sixteenth century chapel of St. Gorgon.

People
 Jean-Pierre Aumer, ballet choreographer, died here in 1833
 Louis Fabulet, translator of the works of Rudyard Kipling lived here.
 The marriage of musician David Hallyday and model Estelle Lefébure took place here in 1989
 Jean Lecanuet, politician, is buried in the abbey

Twin towns
 Hurstpierpoint, England

See also
Saint-Georges de Boscherville Abbey
Communes of the Seine-Maritime department

References

Bibliography
 Gilbert Fromager, Le Canton de Duclair à l'aube du XXe siècle, Duclair, 1986 
 Gilbert Fromager, Le Canton de Duclair 1925-1950, Duclair, 1993 
 Le Patrimoine des communes de la Seine-Maritime, tome 1, éditions Flohic, 1997

External links

 Article and photos of the abbey of Boscherville 
 The abbey at the Circulo Romanico

Communes of Seine-Maritime